"Same Old Story" is the first single from Ultravox's album U-Vox. The single was released 26 September 1986.

Background 

Now as a trio, without original drummer Warren Cann, the single took Ultravox in a new musical direction. "Same Old Story" featured jazzy brass by Beggar and Co, and female vocals in the chorus by Carol Kenyon. It was clear that the 1986 version of Ultravox was now a very different entity.

Mark Brzezicki was hired in and played drums on the album. In the music video of "Same Old Story" Pat Ahern played drums, and he also toured with the band on the U-Vox European Tour.

The B-side was the instrumental track "3", which featured rhythms, synthesizers and Billy Curries recognizable piano.

On the maxi single there was an instrumental version of the U-Vox album track "All in One Day", which featured an orchestra conducted and arranged by George Martin.

"Same Old Story" reached 31 in UK Singles Chart.

Track listing

7" version 

 "Same Old Story" – 3:58
 "3" – 4:01

12" version 

 "Same Old Story (Extended Mix)" – 6:57
 "3" – 4:01
 "All in One Day (Instrumental)" – 6:12

References 

1986 singles
1986 songs
Ultravox songs
Songs written by Midge Ure
Songs written by Billy Currie
Songs written by Chris Cross
Chrysalis Records singles